Ladronka is a homestead at Tomanova 1028/1 in Prague 6, in the Czech Republic. Built by Charles IV, it was bought by an Italian count, then owned by the Sovereign Military Order of Malta before being broken into flats during communism. It was then squatted in 1993, becoming an internationally famous anarchist, self-managed social centre which was evicted in 2000. After several years of renovation, Ladronka was re-opened as an activities centre in 2005, to serve the park it sits within. There are facilities for dining, cycling, rollerskating, beach volleyball and football.

History 
Ladronka is located at Tomanova 1028/1 in the Břevnov district of Prague 6. It was built as a homestead by Charles IV, Holy Roman Emperor in 1340. It was a vineyard and stopping point on the road to Karlštejn castle. An Italian nobleman, the Count Filip Ferdinand de la Crone (or Lacrone), bought the farm in 1688 and it came to be known as Ladronka in a Czech mispronunciation of his name. Ladronka was subsequently owned by the Sovereign Military Order of Malta, then divided into flats under communism. After the Velvet Revolution it stood derelict and was squatted.

Self-managed social centre 
Ladronka was occupied by anarchists in 1993 and became a self-managed social centre. Among the people living there was rapper Vladimír 518. The squatters organised events such as gigs, exhibitions, readings and theatre, also publishing the magazine Autonomie.

The first police raid came in February 1994 and the squatters mustered support with demonstrations and petitions. A year later in January 1995, a large police raid searched the entire building and arrested eight squatters. The squat was not evicted but there were plans to turn the building into a hotel, so the squatters mobilised support again. At a public meeting, local people voiced their opposition to the development plans. An eviction date had been set and on the day the squatters symbolically handed over a paper model of the building to the municipality and continued the occupation.

The social centre became internationally famous as a hub for counter-cultural activities and anarchist organisation. The squatters formed the Ladronka Foundation and successfully negotiated with the city of Prague to legalise the occupation. By the late 1990s, the focus of the centre was shifting from politics to cultural activities, as part of a general downturn in anarchist activity in the Czech Republic.

By this time, the city had signed a contract with the Santé group which planned to develop Ladronka into a luxury medical centre. The social centre was evicted on 9 November 2000 by private security and police as part of a moral panic following the anti-globalization protests in Prague. The eviction was not mandated by any juridical decision.

Activities centre 
After Ladronka was evicted, it was used as a training facility for police dog handlers. Reconstruction plans were delayed by various factors such as the floods in 2002 and the discovery of archaeological remains on the site. Since the park surrounding the building, now known as Ladronka Park, was used for recreation, a plan was devised to use the Ladronka homestead as an activities centre.

At a cost of 80 million crowns, born by Prague 6 and the city of Prague, Ladronka was renovated. It now houses facilities for cycling, rollerskating and other sports. Equipment can be hired and there is a restaurant. Later, beach volleyball and football courts were added. It was opened in September 2005, marking the 85th anniversary of Prague 6. The following year, the centre was nominated for Building of the Year, as decided by the ABF foundation.

See also 
 Klinika
 Squat Milada

References

External links 
 Activities centre

Squatting in the Czech Republic
1340 in Europe
2005 establishments in the Czech Republic
2000 disestablishments in the Czech Republic
Evicted squats
Anarchism in the Czech Republic
Buildings and structures in Prague
1993 establishments in the Czech Republic
Infoshops
21st-century architecture in the Czech Republic
20th-century architecture in the Czech Republic